Pioneer Hall may refer to:

Pioneer Hall (Duluth), a building at the Duluth Entertainment Convention Center
Pioneer Hall (Oregon), a building on the campus of Linfield College in McMinnville, Oregon, listed on the NRHP in Oregon
Pioneer Hall (Pleasant Hill, Tennessee), listed on the NRHP in Tennessee
Pioneer Hall (Seattle), listed on the NRHP in King County, Washington
Pioneer Hall (Texas Woman's University), a building on the campus of Texas Woman's University in Denton, Texas

See also
Pioneer Building (disambiguation)

Architectural disambiguation pages